A magnesium torch is a bright light source made from magnesium, which can burn underwater and in all weather conditions. They are used for emergency illumination for railroad applications. They were also popular in the 1950s as a light source for scuba diving, and were featured occasionally in the Sea Hunt television show. A relay of magnesium torches was used to transfer the Olympic flame from Greece to the site of the Olympic games several times since the first occasion at the 1936 Berlin Games.

Function

It produces intense, bright, white light when it burns. Once ignited, magnesium fires are difficult to extinguish, because combustion continues in nitrogen (forming magnesium nitride), carbon dioxide (forming magnesium oxide and carbon), and water (forming magnesium oxide and hydrogen).

Structure
Details may vary depending on the application. For railway emergency lighting and signalling purposes, the torch may comprise a rolled cardboard structural tube with plastic end covers, one of which may be the ignition device. The fuel is inside and exposed by removing the top end cap. This type of construction may be unsuitable for underwater use.

Uses
All-weather emergency lighting
Carrying the Olympic Flame from 1930 to at least 1984
Underwater light source (obsolete) in the 1950s.
Photographic illumination (historical), using a somewhat different form of torch.

Hazards and safety precautions
Underwater use produces large volumes of hydrogen gas, which if trapped in a confined space with exhaled breathing gas, which typically contains more than 17% oxygen by volume, can form a flammable or explosive gas mixture. The range of explosive mixtures of hydrogen and air or oxygen is unusually wide, but varies with temperature, pressure and other factors.
A magnesium torch does not necessarily give warning of an atmosphere that cannot support life or consciousness, as it continues to burn underwater, or in an oxygen free atmosphere if sufficient nitrogen or carbon dioxide are present.

In popular culture 
 An underwater torch is available in the Education Edition of the Minecraft sandbox video game, created by combining a torch with magnesium on a crafting table.
 Featured occasionally in the Sea Hunt television show.

See also

External links 
 Sea Hunt re-enactment showing the user of underwater magnesium torches at the 7-minute mark
 Stock image of a scuba diver with a magnesium torch

References

Diving equipment
Light sources
History of underwater diving